Baro-Kano railway built between 1908 and 1911 by government of the Northern Nigeria Protectorate was opened to traffic in 1912, to serve as the main rail transport facility from Baro in present Niger state to the emporium of Hausa land Kano (in present Kano state). The first railway built in Nigeria was the Lagos–Kano Railway built by the Lagos Colony (later Southern Nigeria Protectorate). The Baro-Kano Railway and the Lagos Government Railway was later amalgamated by the British colonial government represented by Frederick Lugard in 1914 to form a national system known as Nigerian Railway Department (which later became Nigerian Railway Corporation in the 1950s).

In 1893, the construction of the Lagos railway  began in Lagos, then passed through Ibadan, and later entered Ilorin (the Northern territory). The construction of the Northern Nigeria railway Baro-Kano railway started in 1907  and completed in 1911. It was linked to the Lagos line at Minna. The 
Jebba bridge was completed and the railway was able to travel across the bridge in 1921.

1908–1915 

As of 1908 to 1915 British authority began operating the railway station in Northern Nigeria, the expertise recruited, had challenges and how it was managed which the western railroad technology in tropical latitude being quite challenging and problematic in the country as of the old and new innovative tools. In an  recent efforts of bringing back train on track to of a view in large scale railway transfer to Nigeria technology from Sino-china.

The Baro-Kano Railway as an open line anticipated and also increase the payment amount as interest on the railway loans, with also increase in expenditure and small department to deal with the all masses of technical work and increase expenditure on police, posts, telegraphs and sanitation which totally amounts £246,000/£365,000.

Offa Ilorin railroad 
The Offa and Ilorin railroad also started in 1898 after British colonial established the first rail and one of the oldest gateway of Northern Nigeria railway.

Notes 

Railway stations in Nigeria
Railway lines in Nigeria
Rail transport in Nigeria